The 2011–12 season is the Futebol Clube do Porto's 78th season in the Primeira Liga, officially known as the Liga ZON Sagres for sponsorship reasons. Porto captured their 25th league title last season with their 3 April defeat of rivals Benfica. Manager André Villas-Boas became their manager on 2 July 2010 and won the league with no losses in their domestic campaign. On 20 June 2011, Villas-Boas quit Porto to join Chelsea. The next day, Porto named Vítor Pereira as their new head coach.

Squad

Current squad

Squad changes in 2011–12
In

 Djalma — Marítimo — Free transfer
 Juan Iturbe — Cerro Porteño — €2.5 million
 Kelvin — Paraná Clube — €2.5 million
 Rafael Bracalli — Nacional — Free transfer
 Kléber — Maritimo — €2.3 million
 Alex Sandro — Santos — €9.6 million
 Danilo — Santos — €13 million
 Steven Defour — Standard Liège — €6 million
 Eliaquim Mangala — Standard Liège — €7 million 
 Thibaut Vion — Metz — €300,000 
 Lucho González — Marseille — Free transfer
 Marc Janko — Twente — €3 million

Out

 Mariano González — Estudiantes de La Plata — End of contract
 Coulibaly Yero — Gil Vicente — Undisclosed fee (Porto still holds a percentage of his rights)
 Radamel Falcao — Atlético Madrid — €40 million
 Rúben Micael — Atlético Madrid — €5 million

Out on loan

Competitions

Pre-season and friendlies

Supertaça Cândido de Oliveira

UEFA Super Cup

Primeira Liga

League table

Matches

UEFA Champions League

Group stage

Tiebreakers
APOEL and Zenit St. Petersburg are ranked by their head-to-head records, as shown below.

UEFA Europa League

References

2011-12
Portuguese football clubs 2011–12 season
2011–12 UEFA Champions League participants seasons
2011–12 UEFA Europa League participants seasons
2011-12